Meshir 3 - Coptic Calendar - Meshir 5

The fourth day of the Coptic month of Meshir, the sixth month of the Coptic year. On a common year, this day corresponds to January 29, of the Julian Calendar, and February 11, of the Gregorian Calendar. This day falls in the Coptic Season of Shemu, the season of the Harvest.

Commemorations

Apostles 

 The martyrdom of Saint Agabus, one of the Seventy Apostles

References 

Days of the Coptic calendar